Morán is a Spanish surname. Notable people with the surname include:

Carlos Morán, footballer
Carolina Morán, model
Fátima Leyva Morán, footballer
Fernando Morán López, Spanish politician
Fernando Morán (footballer) (born 1976), Spanish footballer
Fernando Navarro Morán, footballer
Francisco Morán, outfielder/catcher
Héctor Morán, footballer
Humberto Fernández-Morán, scientist
Jorge Morán, footballer
José Manuel Mijares Morán, singer
José Trinidad Morán, Venezuelan militar
Manolo Morán, actor
María Margarita Morán, beauty pageant participant
Mario Morán (born 1992), Mexican actor
Mercedes Morán, actress
Pedro Escartín Morán, footballer
Rolando Morán, freedom fighter
Rubén Morán, footballer
Ruberth Morán, footballer

See also
Morán Municipality in Venezuela
Moran (disambiguation)
Morin (disambiguation)